Murder in the Heartland is a television miniseries that aired on ABC in 1993. It was based on the 1957–58 murder spree carried out by 19-year-old Charles Starkweather throughout Nebraska and Wyoming. Starkweather is played by Tim Roth. The first half of the miniseries covers the murders. The second half covers the trials of Starkweather and Caril Ann Fugate, his 14-year-old grooming victim.  Their increasingly disparate versions of events are contrasted as the trials unfold.

The film received strong praise from critics and Emmy nominations.

Cast
 Tim Roth as Charles Starkweather
 Fairuza Balk as Caril Ann Fugate
 Randy Quaid as Elmer Scheele
 Brian Dennehy as John McArthur
 Roberts Blossom as August "Gus" Meyer
 Tom Bower as Marion Bartlett
 Jennifer Griffin as Velda Bartlett
 Rondi Reed as Jonette Fox
 Bob Gunton as Governor Anderson
 Ryan Cutrona as C. Lauer Ward
 Angie Bolling as Clara Ward
 Jake Carpenter as Robert Jensen
 Heather Kafka as Carol King
 Don Bloomfield as Bobby Colvert
 John Hussey as Mr. Jensen
 James Hansen Prince as Deputy Sheriff Bill Romer
 John S. Davies as Merle Karnopp
 Mark Walters as Chief Robert Ainslie
 Milo O'Shea as Clem Gaughan
 Gerry Bamman as Judge Brooks
 Jeff Perry as Earl Heflin
 Connie Cooper as Hazel Heflin
 Kate Reid as Pansy Street
 Marco Perella as Bob Von Busch (uncredited)
 Renée Zellweger as Barbara Von Busch (uncredited)
 Gary Mitchell Carter as Rodney Starkweather (uncredited)

Production

The entire film was shot on location in and around McKinney and Dallas, Texas.

Brian Dennehy was nominated for the Primetime Emmy Award for Outstanding Supporting Actor in a Limited Series or Movie.  Ronald Victor Garcia was nominated for the Primetime Emmy Award for Outstanding Cinematography for a Limited Series or Movie.

An edited version of the production saw a limited release on VHS.

See also
The Sadist, a 1963 film by James Landis.
Terrence Malick's 1973 movie Badlands, and the title song from Bruce Springsteen's 1982 album Nebraska.
The 1994 film Natural Born Killers was also partly inspired by these events.
The 2004 film Starkweather directed by Bryon Werner.

External links 
 
  Murder in the Heartland at Allmovie

1993 television films
1993 films
American television films
Films directed by Robert Markowitz
Films set in the 1960s
Biographical films about criminals
Films about capital punishment
ABC Motion Pictures films
Cultural depictions of male criminals
Cultural depictions of American men